Siddha is a Sanskrit term meaning "one who is accomplished"; has mastered, or has mastery over pure Consciousness/Knowledge (Chit).
 Siddhar; Chittar, a variant English spelling

Siddha may refer to:

 Siddha, in Hinduism, a person who has attained a high level of spiritual enlightenment
 Siddha Yoga, a spiritual path in Hindu traditions
 Siddha medicine, a form of South Indian, Tamil traditional medicine

Places
 Siddha, Gandaki, a town in Nepal
 Siddha, Janakpur, a town in Nepal

See also
 Mahasiddha, a term for someone who embodies and cultivates siddhi of perfection